Once There Was a Waltz is a 1932 German operetta film directed by Victor Janson and starring Mártha Eggerth, Rolf von Goth and Paul Hörbiger. It was shot at the Tempelhof Studios in Berlin with sets designed by the art director Jacek Rotmil. It premiered in Berlin on 14 April 1932. The film was remade in Britain as Where Is This Lady?, released the same year.

Cast
 Mártha Eggerth as Steffi Pirzinger
 Rolf von Goth as Rudi Moebius
 Paul Hörbiger as Franz Pirzinger
 Ernő Verebes as Gustl Linzer
 Albert Paulig as Assessor Pfennig
 Lizzi Natzler as Lucie Weidling
 Ida Wüst as Frau Generalkonsul Weidling
 Fritz Greiner as Fiakerkutscher
 Ernst Pröckl as Ein Kellner
 Paul Wrede as Silhouettenschneider
 Lina Woiwode as Frau Zacherl
 Hermann Blaß as Notar Sauerwein
 Marcel Wittrisch as Singer
 Ernst Wurmser
 Trude Rosen
 Kitty Meinhardt
 Gerta Rozan

References

Bibliography

External links

1932 films
Films of the Weimar Republic
1932 musical films
German musical films
Operetta films
1930s German-language films
Films directed by Victor Janson
Films with screenplays by Billy Wilder
German multilingual films
Films shot at Tempelhof Studios
German black-and-white films
1932 multilingual films
1930s German films